The second season of Brothers & Sisters consisted of only sixteen episodes due to the 2007–2008 Writers Guild of America strike. Twelve of the episodes were shown beforehand, ending with "Compromises"; a further four episodes were produced to finish off the season. The first half of the season dealt with many issues and plot points left unresolved from the first season.

In the UK the show changed to Channel 4's sister Channel E4 beginning March 30 and ending in July. The series was then repeated on Channel 4 in October of the same year around 4:30 pm on Saturdays, but after a couple of weeks moved it to Sunday nights in an unspecified time slot after midnight.

Cast
Rob Lowe, who portrays Robert McCallister, is upgraded to a series regular as his character prepares to marry Kitty.

This season also introduced new recurring characters Graham Finch (Steven Weber) and Isaac Marshall (Danny Glover) as love interests for Sarah and Nora respectively. Emily Rose will also guest star as Lena Branigan; a friend of Rebecca's who starts working at Walker Landing and grows close to Tommy. Luke Macfarlane will also reappear as Scotty Wandell.

Series producer Ken Olin also guest stars as David Caplan, a film director and Holly's ex-boyfriend.

Main
Dave Annable as Justin Walker
Maxwell Perry Cotton as Cooper Whedon
Kerris Dorsey as Paige Whedon
Sally Field as Nora Walker
Calista Flockhart as Kitty Walker
Balthazar Getty as Tommy Walker
Rachel Griffiths as Sarah Walker
Rob Lowe as Robert McCallister
Sarah Jane Morris as Julia Walker
Matthew Rhys as Kevin Walker
Ron Rifkin as Saul Holden
Emily VanCamp as Rebecca Harper
Patricia Wettig as Holly Harper

Recurring and notable guest stars
Danny Glover as Isaac Marshall
Luke Macfarlane as Scotty Wandell
Emily Rose as Lena Branigan
John Pyper-Ferguson as Joe Whedon
Tom Skerritt as William Walker
Steven Weber as Graham Finch
Eric Winter as Jason McCallister

Storylines

Nora
Nora spent the summer sending video messages to Justin and it is only with Rebecca's help that she has managed to get by. Once he returns, she and Rebecca spend time trying to help him recover physically and mentally. Nora enters into a new romance with Isaac Marshall (Danny Glover) after meeting him when Kitty brings him in to assist with Robert's campaign.

Sarah
Sarah now must deal with being a single parent, and begins a relationship with Graham (Steven Weber), who comes to work at Ojai. He suggests a risky business deal to help raise Ojai's profits, which Saul supports but Sarah is not on board until the very end. The deals falls apart, leaving the business in jeopardy. After this, she decides to end her relationship with Graham telling him that her feelings for him clouded her judgment. This also causes tension between her and her mother, as she takes the blame for the deal. It is only after Saul reveals the truth that Nora apologizes to Sarah.

Sarah is angered after the only way to save the company from closing is to merge with 'Walker Landing,' which sees she and Tommy as vice-presidents but Holly as chair and CEO of the entire company. Although she accepts this is the only solution, she finds it difficult to report to Holly, as she believes Holly plans to take the entire company from the Walker family.

Kevin
While Jason goes away for six months on church work, Kevin is reunited with Scotty and decides to end things with Jason so that he and Scotty can give their relationship another try. They move in together and get married in the season finale. At the same time, Kevin tries to get his uncle Saul to accept his own feelings and admit to his homosexuality, which strains their relationship until Saul finally admits the truth.

Kevin, along with Sarah, becomes suspicious about why Rebecca's initial, along with theirs, was used for William's password to his secret accounts. Kevin, while recalling how his father accepted his sexuality, remembers his father talking of another woman he knew who had a son named Ryan and they believe that he, in fact, is their father's love child and not Rebecca. They sit Nora down in the final episode to reveal what they have discovered.

Kitty & Robert
Kitty and Robert plan their wedding as well as deal with Robert's campaign. In the middle of the season, they are married at Nora's home. Prior to the wedding, Kitty discovers she is pregnant and, although at first they are worried, Kitty soon becomes excited. But, their happiness is short-lived when Kitty experiences a miscarriage. Then, they discover they're unable to conceive naturally. After several failed attempts, at the end of the season, they decide to explore adoption.

Tommy & Julia
At the start of the season, Tommy and Julia are struggling because of the death of their son. Julia decides they need some time apart and goes to stay with her parents. During this separation, Tommy begins an affair with his new secretary, and friend of Rebecca, Lena (Emily Rose). He calls things off with Lena when Julia comes home, although he reveals the truth to Julia and she reveals she had a one-night stand with an old boyfriend. They decide to stay together and work on their marriage.

Justin & Rebecca
After being injured, Justin returns from Iraq early. Together, Nora and Rebecca try to help him heal, yet he finds recovery extremely difficult and becomes addicted to his pain medication. He begins a romance with Lena, after Tommy ends their affair, which Rebecca is unhappy about. After a confrontation with Rebecca (resulting in her moving back in with her mother) about his relationship and his medication, Justin seeks help and his brother stays with him during his withdrawal.

Rebecca then meets David, an old friend of Holly's, which leads to her discovery that she is not in fact a Walker and that David is her real father. After trying to hide this from the Walkers, in fear of being rejected, she finally comes clean and each of them tells her that she will always be part of the family. Near the end of the season, Justin tries to hide and deny his growing feelings for Rebecca, and after he admits how he feels, she reveals that they are not related and believes that everything that has happened was meant to bring them together. The season ends with Justin and Rebecca sharing their first kiss.

Episodes

Production
The show was created by Ken Olin and Jon Robin Baitz. Brothers & Sisters is produced by Berlanti Television, After Portsmouth, and Touchstone Television (Fall 2006-Spring 2007), which is now ABC Studios (Fall 2007–present).

Ratings
The second season ranked #38, one place down from the previous year and averaged at around 11.5 million viewers.

References

2007 American television seasons
2008 American television seasons